Women in Ecuador are generally responsible for the upbringing and care of children and families; traditionally, men have not taken an active role. Ever more women have been joining the workforce, which has resulted in men doing some housework, and becoming more involved in the care of their children. This change has been greatly influenced by Eloy Alfaro's liberal revolution in 1906, in which Ecuadorian women were granted the right to work. Women's suffrage was granted in 1929.

Girls tend to be more protected by their parents than boys, due to traditional social structures. Ecuadorian women on the other hand, seem to be less protected as they will face many problems, including domestic violence, poverty and lack of proper access to healthcare.

Poverty
Women, especially rural women, are disproportionately affected by poverty. Women are more likely to be unemployed. In 2019, the unemployment rate for women in Ecuador was 5.0%, and male unemployment was 3.3%. In 2012, the total labor force was roughly 7.39 million people. In comparison this means roughly 125,630 more women are going unemployed.

In 2013 the CDT stated in rural areas women made $219 monthly, compared to men making $293 monthly, and in urban areas women made $421 monthly, and men made $524 monthly. According to this statistic, women are making roughly 13-26% less than men monthly. Labor force participation is also disproportionate in Ecuador, with women participating 56%, and men participating nearly 83%, thats a 27% gap in participation between each sex.

Poverty and malnutrition are most likely to affect women, as well as young children and indigenous populations. A study in 2014, found that nearly 23.9% of children under the age of 5 have been stunted in their growth due to malnutrition. Discrimination based on ethnicity interacts with discrimination based on sex, resulting in very high levels of poverty for indigenous and black women.

Education

Girls traditionally have been less likely to be formally educated than men. Traditional gender roles lead women towards 'female jobs', such as nursing and teaching, which are underpaid and under-appreciated. Women still have a lower literacy rate than men: as of 2011, the literacy rate was 90.2% female and 93.1% male. In recent years, several programs have promoted education for the indigenous girls and women.

The situation for indigenous people is worse. When it comes to educational attainment in 1999, while the number for non-indigenous females aged 12–65 was 8.0 years to complete the education, indigenous females had only 3.8 years. It means that indigenous women can take less time to study compared to men. In terms of school enrollment rate, there is no big difference for primary school because of gender difference and indigenous or not, but indigenous females had much less lower-secondary and higher-secondary enrollment rates. For lower-secondary, indigenous females had only 10.08% while non-indigenous females had 59.79%. These facts make it more difficult for indigenous people in Ecuador to get a job. In Kichwa's case, mestiza women tend to be hired more than Kichwa women because many people assume that indigenous people are not "advanced." It is a common idea that mestiza are more intelligent like WASPs.

Social reproduction happens among women in Ecuador in terms of education. According to Shenton's interview, some women had attended a university, own their own business, and they seek to let their daughters do what they did. Shenton stated that it is an obligation for educated people to provide their children with the education. They hope their children get educated and have more possibilities for their life.

Reproductive health
Poor information and access to contraceptive methods often lead to unwanted pregnancies, especially among teenage girls and young women. The maternal mortality rate in Ecuador is 110 deaths/100,000 live births (as of 2010). The HIV/AIDS rate is 0.6% for adults (aged 15–49), as of 2012 estimates.
Abortion in Ecuador is illegal, with only few exceptions for special circumstances. According to a Human Rights Watch report, legal abortion is usually denied to women, even in the case of rape. In recent years, being confronted with the highest teenage pregnancy rate in South America, Ecuador has decided to liberalize its policy regarding contraception, including emergency contraception.

A study was conducted in 2017 to identify infectious diseases associated to preterm delivery. This study focused on the effects of the Zika virus on pregnant women. The study found that thirty-two of the fifty-nine women tested were Zika positive. They found that the virus was prevalent in the women's reproductive tract. The Zika virus has been linked with birth defects in newborns. These defects include microcephaly, Guillain-Barré syndrome, and a weakened immune and nervous system.

Domestic violence

Domestic violence against women is a very serious problem. La Ley Contra la Violencia a la Mujer y la Familia (Law on Violence against Women and the Family) deals with domestic violence. This law was heavily influenced by the Consejo Nacional de las Mujeres CONAMU (National Council of Women) and by what they believe in and stand for. A rough translation of their missions statement is to further enable our efforts and resources to create conditions of equality for women and to develop a society where women are included in economic, political, social, and cultural ways of life. The council believes this can be achieved if we focus on creating a violence-free society, a society where women’s physical and psychological well-being is protected.

A study was conducted with data from 2010 comparing woman's wealth to domestic violence in Ecuador. They found that violence increased when the man was the only source of income, and saw no significant relationship when the woman had higher wealth than the man. In addition, a new Criminal Code came into force in 2014, which also addresses domestic violence.

See also 
 Human trafficking in Ecuador

References

External links 

 Ecuadorian Women March in Defense of the Amazon
 Characteristics of typical Ecuadorian woman